Sigrid & Marina are a vocal duo from Austria, who perform in a range of popular music (schlager), traditional Volksmusik and Volkstümliche Musik. The sisters, Sigrid (born 9 April 1981) and Marina Hutterer (born 12 August 1984), come from Gmunden in Salzkammergut, Upper Austria.

Career
In 1998, the duo entered a talent competition, with their first single release taking place the following year. They later appeared on ORF, the national public service broadcaster in Austria. In 2000 they released another single Das Lied, das der Sommer singt (The Song that Summer Sings), then in 2001 Bald kommt ein neuer Tag (A New Day is Coming Soon). In the same year, the sisters later performed for Austria, in the regional Grand Prix der Volksmusik 2001 (Grand Prix of Folk Music) reaching 5th place with their new song release. In 2002, Sigrid & Marina reached 2nd place in the Mitteldeutscher Rundfunk (MDR) - Central German Broadcasting year charts with Wir hab'n die Buam. In 2004 they released their first music album, Mein Herz sehnt sich so sehr nach Liebe (My Heart Longs so Much for Love).

Sigrid & Marina performed a second time in Grand Prix der Volksmusik, reaching 6th place in the Austrian pre-judging with the song Träume sterben nie (Dreams Never Die). A year later they entered again, reaching 5th place in the Austrian pre-selection in the title, We Enjoy Life.

In 2007, alongside another Austrian music Group "Zillertaler Haderlumpen", Sigrid & Marina won the Grand Prix der Volksmusik 2007, singing Alles hat zwei Seiten (Everything Has Two Sides). The duo learned how to play the guitar and keyboard before the start of their career, of which they had their 20-year anniversary in 2018.

The sisters have since done various performances, including an open-air concert, the Hansi Hinterseer Open Air 2010, singing Zwei Senoritas (Two Señoritas), which was released in 2010 on the album 'Ihre grossen Erfolge & 5 neue Titel'. They have also performed on the popular entertainment program, Musikantenstadl. Songs performed include Edelweiss from The Sound of Music and Mariandl, composed by Hans Lang. The song itself which has also been performed by Petula Clark and Jimmy Young in its English version.

There is a small fan base of Sigrid & Marina in the UK. In 2008, BBC Radio Manchester commentator, Ian Cheeseman revealed he was a fan of the folk music duo, having a collection of their songs.

Discography

 2004 − Mein Herz sehnt sich so sehr nach Liebe (My heart longs so much for love)
 2005 − Für ein Dankeschön ist es nie zu spät (For a thank you, it is never too late)
 2006 − Träume sterben nie (Dreams never die)
 2007 − Leben heißt lieben (Life is love)
 2008 − Einfach glücklich sein (Simply be happy)
 2009 − Heimatgefühle auch als Deluxe-Version mit DVD (Sense of Home), released as a deluxe version with DVD
 2010 - Ihre grossen Erfolge & 5 neue Titel (Their successes, and 5 new titles)
 2011 - Von Herzen (From the heart), ''DVD release also, September 30
 2011 - Lieder sind wie Freunde (Songs are like friends)
 2012 - Heimatgefühle Folge 2
 2013 - Das Beste aus Heimatgefühle
 2014 - Ein Hallo mit Musik
 2014 - Das Beste – 20 große Erfolge
 2015 - Lust am Leben
 2017 - Heimatgefühle Folge 3
 2018 - Das größte Glück - 20 Jahre Jubiläum
 2019 - Halleluja der Berge
 2020 - A Weihnacht wie's früher war
 2022 - Volle Lust und volles G'fühl

References

External links
Official website
Sigrid & Marina, Musikantenstadl - Mariandl
Sigrid & Marina, Hansi Hantiseer Open Air - Zwei Senoritas
Sigrid & Marina - Eidelweiss

Schlager groups
21st-century Austrian women singers
Austrian folk singers